The Turkic term  oğuz or oğur (in z- and r-Turkic, respectively) is a historical term for "military division, clan, or tribe" among the Turkic peoples.
With the Mongol invasions of 1206–21, the Turkic khaganates were replaced by Mongol or hybrid Turco-Mongol confederations, where the corresponding military division came to be known as orda.

Background

The 8th-century Kül Tigin stela has the earliest instance of the term in Old Turkic epigraphy: Toquz Oghuz, the "nine tribes".
Later the word appears often for two largely separate groups of the Turkic migration in the early medieval period, namely:
Onogur "ten tribes"
Utigurs
Kutrigurs
Uyghur

The stem uq-, oq- "kin, tribe" is from a Proto-Turkic *uk.
The Old Turkic word has often been connected with oq "arrow";
Pohl (2002) in explanation of this connection adduces the Chinese T'ang-shu chronicle, which reports
"the khan divided his realm into ten tribes. To the leader of each tribe, he sent an arrow. The name [of these ten leaders] was 'the ten she ', but they were also called 'the ten arrows'."

An oguz (ogur) was in origin a military division of a Nomadic empire, which acquired tribal or ethnic connotations, by processes of ethnogenesis.

References

Karoly Czeglédy, On the Numerical Composition of the Ancient Turkic Tribal Confederations, Acta Orient. Hung., 25 (1972), 275-281.

Further reading

See also
Turkic peoples
Oghur Turks
Oghuz Turks
Huns
Xiongnu
Khaganate
Turkic migration
Orda (organization)